Giuseppe Ruggiero (born 28 October 1993) is an Italian footballer who plays as a midfielder for Serie D club Portici 1906.

Career

Juventus
Ruggiero was a player of Juventus F.C.'s reserve team from 2010 to 2012, and as an overage player in 2012–13 season. He received call-ups from the first team in 2011, for pre-season friendlies against Cuneo and Real Betis in August as well as the opening match of Juventus Stadium, against Notts County. Ruggiero was a player for bianconeri's Allievi team in 2009–10 season.

Pro Vercelli
On 5 July 2013 Ruggiero and Nazzareno Belfasti were signed by Pro Vercelli for €470,000 and €260,000 respectively in co-ownership deals, as part of the bought back of Elio De Silvestro €760,000. Ruggiero won promotion back to Serie B with the Piedmontese side in 2014. On 19 June 2014, the co-ownerships were renewed. However, in August 2014 Belfasti was bought back by Juve.

In July 2014 Ruggiero returned to Lega Pro for Ascoli in a temporary deal. On 5 February 2015, his transfer to Slovenian club ND Gorica was confirmed. On 2 February 2015 Pro Vercelli also acquired Ruggiero (for €250,000) and Luca Castiglia outright (for €1.5 million), and sold Cristian Bunino to Turin (for €1.75 million).

On 24 July 2015 he was signed by Cuneo.

References

External links

Italian footballers
Juventus F.C. players
F.C. Pro Vercelli 1892 players
Ascoli Calcio 1898 F.C. players
ND Gorica players
A.C. Cuneo 1905 players
Savona F.B.C. players
A.S.D. Nocerina 1910 players
S.S.C. Giugliano players
Serie C players
Serie D players
Italian expatriate footballers
Expatriate footballers in Slovenia
Italian expatriate sportspeople in Slovenia
Italy youth international footballers
Association football midfielders
1993 births
Living people